The R22 is a provincial route in the KwaZulu-Natal province of South Africa, connecting the N2 at Hluhluwe with the Mozambique border at Kosi Bay, via Mbazwana and Kwangwanase. It was opened on 25 October 2008.

References

22

Provincial routes in South Africa